Suicide Bridge is a novel by Iain Sinclair.

The book examines the characters of William Blake's Jerusalem as influenced by their psychogeography.
The book mixes poetry with prose essays.

Bibliography

References

External links

"Iain Sinclair: Revolutionary Novelist or Revolting Nihilist?", militant esthetix, Ben Watson

1979 British novels